Mount Olive High School may refer to:

Mount Olive High School (Illinois) — Mount Olive, Illinois
Mount Olive High School (Mississippi) — Mount Olive, Mississippi
Mount Olive High School (New Jersey) — Flanders, New Jersey
Mount Olive High School (North Carolina), Mount Olive, North Carolina